Vasantha Kunder (born 20 July 1980) is a cricketer who plays for the Bahrain national cricket team. He played in the 2013 ICC World Cricket League Division Six tournament.

References

External links
 

1980 births
Living people
Bahraini cricketers
People from Udupi district
Indian expatriates in Bahrain